The following squads were named for the 1936 Summer Olympics tournament.

Head coach:  James Hogan

Head coach: Ngan Shing Kwan

1This English club name is from The Little Red Book of Chinese Football, written by Dave Twydell. The correct name of the club at that time should be "You-you".

Head coach:  Booth

Head coach:  Ferdinand Fabra

Sixteen players competed at the Olympics. The formal application also included five other players who did not travel to Berlin: Veli Leskinen (HT Helsinki), Eino Virtanen (Helsingin PS), Eino Kilpi (Helsingin PS), Yrjö Kylmälä (HT Helsinki), and Arvo Hyyrynen (Sudet Viipuri).

Head coach: Otto Nerz

Head coach: William Voisey

Head coach: Zoltán Opata

Head coach: Vittorio Pozzo

Head coach:  Shigeyoshi Suzuki

Head coach: Paul Feierstein

Head coach: Asbjørn Halvorsen

Seventeen players went to the Olympics. The formal application originally included five other players who did not travel to Berlin: Sverre Kvammen (Viking FK), Rolf Johannessen (Fredrikstad FK), Kjeld Kjos (SFK Brann), Birger Pedersen (SK Hardy), and Petter Svennungsen (Odd Grenland).

Head coach: Alberto Denegri

Head coach: Józef Kałuża

Sweden
Head coach: John Pettersson

Head coach:  James Elliot Donnelly

Head coach:  Elmer Schroeder

Footnotes

References
 FIFA
 RSSSF
 Great Britain team at British Olympic Association 
 List of Luxembourgian olympic footballers at ALO
 Turkey national football team: match reports 1935-1936, Walter Verani, Erdinç Sivritepe and Turkish Soccer
 Swedish Olympic Committee
 List of Norway international footballers

Olympics
1936 Summer Olympics